Melodies of Vera Quarter (Georgian: ვერის უბნის მელოდიები) is a 1973 Georgian musical film directed by Giorgi Shengelaia.

Plot
Pavle, who is a poor cart-driver has two girls, Maro and Tamro. The girls have a dream to take classes at a ballet school, but Pavle cannot afford such a luxury. Vardo, a laundress, decides to help the little girls. For that purpose she steals a cattle, firewood and a mink coat from a rich merchant's house. She warms up Pavle's house with the stolen firewood and pays tutorship for the girls' ballet classes. Vardo gets caught for larceny. All the laundresses in the neighborhood go on strike in Vardo's support. Scared chief of local police sets Vardo free and enlists the girls in the ballet school.

Awards
1977 —  Special Jury Prize on San Sebastián International Film Festival, Spain

External links

1973 films
Soviet musical films
Georgian-language films
Kartuli Pilmi films
Soviet-era films from Georgia (country)
Films directed by Giorgi Shengelaia
1970s musical films